Paul Foster may refer to:
Paul Foster (bowls), Scottish bowls player
Paul Foster (cartoonist) (1934–2003), cartoonist and writer
Paul Foster (soccer) (born 1967), Australian soccer player
Paul Foster (playwright) (born 1931), American playwright, theater director, and producer
Paul Foster (singer) (1920–1995), gospel singer
Paul Frederick Foster (1889–1972), U.S. Navy vice admiral, Medal of Honor recipient
USS Paul F. Foster (DD-964)
Paul H. Foster (1939–1967), USMC, Medal of Honor recipient, killed in action in Vietnam
Paul L. Foster, American businessman
Col. Paul Foster, a character in the Gerry Anderson UFO series

See also
Paul Foster Case (1884–1954), U.S. occultist and author